Moonlake is the thirty-fifth album by Klaus Schulze. It was originally released in 2005, and, taking in consideration the previously released multi-disc box sets (Silver Edition, Historic Edition, Jubilee Edition, Contemporary Works I, and Contemporary Works II), it could be viewed as Schulze's ninety-sixth album. The first two tracks were made in the studio; the last two are live.

Although the booklet states (as above) that "Same Thoughts Lion" and "Mephisto" are the remastered live tracks, there is a suggestion that it is "Mephisto" and the second half of "Playmate in Paradise" that are live, possibly from a performance in Poznan (Poland) on 5 November 2003.

Track listing
All tracks composed by Klaus Schulze.

External links
 Moonlake at the official site of Klaus Schulze
 

Klaus Schulze albums
2005 albums